John Walton (1952 – 17 July 2014) was an Australian actor of stage, television, and film, best known for his roles in television soap operasThe Young Doctors and The Sullivans.

Walton was born in St. Ives, Sydney, Australia.

Roles 
He played Doctor Craig Rothwell in the television soap opera The Young Doctors during 1976 and 1977. In 1984, he also appeared in the miniseries Bodyline, and he played the part of Sir Charles Kingsford Smith in the Australian mini-series A Thousand Skies. He also completed a stint in Heartbreak High playing Nat Delaine from 1997 until 1998.

He appeared as Michael Watkins, the nephew of Ida (Vivean Gray) Jessop, on The Sullivans, from episodes no. 239-433. He married Maggie (Vikki Hammond) Hayward's daughter, Alice (Megan Williams) Morgan but it was not a happy marriage. He was killed in a car accident, after throwing his mistress, Pamela (Diane Craig) Somers from the vehicle, saving her life.

Other television credits include: Cop Shop, Skyways, A Country Practice, Halifax f.p., McLeod's Daughters, All Saints, MDA and most recently Blue Heelers.

Death 
John Walton died at his home in Perth following a long battle with Huntington's disease, aged 62.

References

External links 
 

1952 births
2014 deaths
Australian male television actors